A zoo (shortened form of "zoological garden") is a place where all animals are exhibited.

Zoo may also refer to:

Places
Zoo Junction, a major railroad junction in Philadelphia
Zoo station (disambiguation), several railway stations
One of the nicknames of Kalamazoo, Michigan

Art, entertainment, and media

Films
Zoo, a 1961 documentary film by Bert Haanstra
Zoo, a 1999 dark comedy with David Carradine
Zoo (2005 film), a Japanese portmanteau film based on short stories by Otsuichi
Zoo (2007 film), a documentary about the life and death of Kenneth Pinyan
Postcards from the Zoo (also known as Zoo), a 2012 film by Edwin
Zootopia, a film Disney
Zoo (2017 film), a film by Colin McIvor
Zoo (2018 film), a Hindi-language drama film directed by Shlok Sharma
A Zed & Two Noughts (also known as Zoo and Z00), a 1985 film by Peter Greenaway

Literature 
Zoo (book), a non-fiction book by Louis MacNeice
 Zoo (Patterson novel), a 2012 novel by James Patterson and Michael Ledwidge
Zoo (Vidmar novel), a 2005 Slovenian novel by Janja Vidmar
 The Zoo Story, a play by Edward Albee

Music

Groups and labels
Zoo (dance troupe), the last Top Of The Pops dance troupe from 1980s
Zoo (Japanese band), a J-pop band from the early 1990s
Zoo (Norwegian band), a Norwegian band active in the late 70s and early 80s
The Zoo (Filipino band), an indie rock band from the Philippines
The Zoo (American band), a band formed by Mike Flicker and Howard Leese in the 1960s
Zoo Entertainment (record label), an American independent record label formed in the early 1990s, now defunct
Zoo Music, an American independent record label founded by Dee Dee Penny of the Dum Dum Girls
Zoo Records, a British independent record label formed in 1978

Recordings
 Zoo (Ceremony album), 2012
 Zoo (Russ album), 2018
 "The Zoo" (song), by Scorpions, 1980
 "Zoo" (song), by Red Velvet, 2017
 "Zoo", a song by Fetty Wap and Tee Grizzley, 2019
 "Zoo", a song by Alphaville from CrazyShow, 2003
 "Zoo", a song by the Legendary Pink Dots from Nemesis Online, 1998
 "Zoo", a song by Winner from We, 2019
 "The Zoo (The Human Zoo)", a song by the Commodores from Machine Gun, 1974

Periodicals
Zoo Magazine, a German magazine
Zoo Weekly, formerly Zoo, a men's magazine in the United Kingdom, Australia and South Africa

Television
 Zoo (TV series), 2015 television adaptation of James Patterson's novel
 Our Zoo, a British drama television series
 The Zoo (British TV series), a British television series airing on CBBC
 The Zoo (Australian TV series), an Australian television series
 The Zoo (New Zealand TV series), a New Zealand television series
The Zoo, an Animal Planet docu-series about the Bronx Zoo

Other arts, entertainment, and media

Morning zoo, a format of off-beat morning radio
The Zoo, a comic opera by Arthur Sullivan
Zoo, a brand used for events organised by the Oxford University Student Union

Businesses and organizations
Zoo Entertainment (video game company), an American video game publisher
Zoo Corporation, a Japanese video game and medical equipment developer and publisher
Zoo Outreach Organisation (ZOO), an Indian non-governmental organization
United States Air Force Academy, nicknamed The Zoo or The Blue Zoo

Technology
Zoo (file format), a 1980s archive file format developed by Rahul Dhesi
SPAAG ZSU-23-4, a Soviet self-propelled anti-aircraft gun, nicknamed "zoo" by US soldiers

Other uses
Zoo (Anthrocon), an informal meeting place at the Anthrocon convention
Asunción Mixtepec Zapotec (ISO 639-3 language code "zoo")
Saugeen–Maitland Hall, at the University of Western Ontario in London, Ontario, Canada

See also
List of zoos
Zeus (disambiguation)
Zo (disambiguation)
Zoology (disambiguation)